Robert Montgomery Knight (born October 25, 1940) is an American former basketball coach. Nicknamed "the General", Knight won 902 NCAA Division I men's college basketball games, a record at the time of his retirement, and currently fifth all-time. Knight is best known as the head coach of the Indiana Hoosiers from 1971 to 2000. He also coached at Texas Tech (2001–2008) and at Army (1965–1971).

While at Army, he led the Black Knights to four post-season tournament appearances in six seasons, winning two-thirds of his games along the way.  His success at Army led to his being a candidate for several major university jobs, including Wisconsin and Indiana.  After taking the job at Indiana, Knight led his teams to three NCAA championships, one National Invitation Tournament (NIT) championship, and 11 Big Ten Conference championships. His 1975–76 team went undefeated during the regular season and won the 1976 NCAA tournament. Knight received National Coach of the Year honors four times and Big Ten Coach of the Year honors eight times. In 1984, he coached the USA men's Olympic team to a gold medal, becoming one of only three basketball coaches to win an NCAA title, NIT title, and an Olympic gold medal.

Knight was one of college basketball's most successful and innovative coaches, having popularized the motion offense. Knight sparked controversy with his outspoken nature and demonstrative behavior. He once famously threw a chair across the court during a game, which was rewarded with an ejection. Knight was once arrested in Puerto Rico following a physical confrontation with a police officer. Knight regularly displayed a volatile nature and was sometimes accused of verbal conflicts with members of the press. He was also recorded on videotape appearing to have possibly grabbed one of his players by the neck. Knight remains "the object of near fanatical devotion" from many of his former players and Indiana fans. Nevertheless, Knight was accused of choking a player during practice. Following the incident, a "zero tolerance" policy was instituted specifically for coach Knight. After a subsequent run-in with a student, university president Myles Brand fired Knight in the fall of 2000.  He went on to coach at Texas Tech, mostly without incident, from 2001 to 2008. In the seven full seasons he coached the Red Raiders, his teams qualified for a post-season tournament 5 times.  He retired part way through the 2007-2008 season, and was replaced by his son Pat Knight at Texas Tech.

In 2008, Knight joined ESPN as a men's college basketball studio analyst during Championship Week and for coverage of the NCAA Tournament. He continued covering college basketball for ESPN through the 2014–15 season.

Early life
Knight was born in 1940 in the town of Massillon, Ohio, and grew up in Orrville, Ohio. He began playing organized basketball at Orrville High School.

College career 
Knight continued at Ohio State in 1958 when he played for Basketball Hall of Fame coach Fred Taylor. Despite being a star player in high school, he played a reserve role as a forward on the 1960 Ohio State Buckeyes team that won the NCAA Championship and featured future Hall of Fame players John Havlicek and Jerry Lucas. The Buckeyes lost to the Cincinnati Bearcats in each of the next two NCAA Championship games, of which Knight was also a part.

Due in part to the star power of those Ohio State teams, Knight usually received scant playing time, but that did not prevent him from making an impact. In the 1961 NCAA Championship game, Knight came off the bench with 1:41 on the clock and Cincinnati leading Ohio State, 61–59. In the words of then-Ohio State assistant coach Frank Truitt,
Knight got the ball in the left front court and faked a drive into the middle. Then [he] crossed over like he worked on it all his life and drove right in and laid it up. That tied the game for us, and Knight ran clear across the floor like a 100-yard dash sprinter and ran right at me and said, 'See there, coach, I should have been in that game a long time ago!'
To which Truitt replied, "Sit down, you hot dog. You're lucky you're even on the floor."

In addition to lettering in basketball at Ohio State, it has been claimed that Knight also lettered in football and baseball; however, the official list of Ohio State football letter earners does not include Knight. Knight graduated with a degree in history and government in 1962.

Coaching career

Army
After graduating from Ohio State University in 1962, he coached junior varsity basketball at Cuyahoga Falls High School in Ohio for one year. Knight then enlisted in the United States Army and served on active duty from June 1963 to June 1965 and in the army reserves from June 1965 to May 1969. He conducted initial training at Fort Leonard Wood, Missouri and was transferred to West Point, New York in September 1963. He became a private first class.

While in the army, he accepted an assistant coaching position with the Army Black Knights in 1963, where, two years later, he was named head coach at the relatively young age of 24. In six seasons at West Point, Knight won 102 games, with his first as a head coach coming against Worcester Polytechnic Institute. One of his players was Mike Krzyzewski, who later served as his assistant before becoming a Hall of Fame head coach at Duke. Mike Silliman was another of Knight's players at Army, and Knight was quoted as saying, "Mike Silliman is the best player I have ever coached."

During his tenure at Army, Knight gained a reputation for having an explosive temper. For example, after Army's 66–60 loss to BYU and Hall of Fame coach Stan Watts in the semifinals of the 1966 NIT, Knight completely lost control, kicking lockers and verbally blasting the officials. Embarrassed, he later went to Watts' hotel room and apologized. Watts forgave him, and is quoted as saying, "I want you to know that you're going to be one of the bright young coaches in the country, and it's just a matter of time before you win a national championship."

Knight was one of seven candidates vying to fill the Wisconsin men's basketball head coaching vacancy after John Erickson resigned to become the Milwaukee Bucks' first-ever general manager on April 3, 1968. He was offered the position but requested more time to think it over. By the time he returned to West Point, news that he was to become the Badgers' new coach was prematurely leaked to the local media. After consulting with Bo Schembechler who the previous year also had a negative experience as a Wisconsin football coaching candidate, Knight withdrew his candidacy and continued to coach at Army for three more seasons. Erickson's assistant coach John Powless was promoted instead.

Indiana
In 1971, Indiana University hired Knight as head coach. During his 29 years at the school, the Hoosiers won 662 games, including 22 seasons of 20 or more wins, while losing 239, a .735 winning percentage. In 24 NCAA tournament appearances at Indiana, Hoosier teams under Knight won 42 of 63 games (.667), winning titles in 1976, 1981, and 1987, while losing in the semi-finals in 1973 and 1992.

1970s
In 1972–73, Knight's second year as coach, Indiana won the Big Ten championship and reached the Final Four, but lost to UCLA, who was on its way to its seventh consecutive national title. The following season, 1973–74, Indiana once again captured a Big Ten title. In the two following seasons, 1974–75 and 1975–76, the Hoosiers were undefeated in the regular season and won 37 consecutive Big Ten games, including two more Big Ten championships. The 1974–75 Hoosiers swept the entire Big Ten by an average of 22.8 points per game. However, in an 83–82 win against Purdue they lost consensus All-American forward Scott May to a broken left arm. With May's injury keeping him to 7 minutes of play, the No. 1 Hoosiers lost to Kentucky 92–90 in the Mideast Regional. The Hoosiers were so dominant that four starters – Scott May, Steve Green, Kent Benson and Quinn Buckner – would make the five-man All-Big Ten team. The following season, 1975–76, the Hoosiers went the entire season and 1976 NCAA tournament without a single loss, beating Michigan 86–68 in the title game. Immediately after the game, Knight lamented that "it should have been two." The 1976 Hoosiers remain the last undefeated NCAA Division I men's basketball team. Through these two seasons, Knight's teams were undefeated in the regular season, including a perfect 37–0 record in Big Ten games on their way to their third and fourth conference titles in a row. Behind the play of Mike Woodson, Indiana won the 1979 NIT championship.

1980s

The 1979–80 Hoosiers, led by Mike Woodson and Isiah Thomas, won the Big Ten championship and advanced to the 1980 Sweet Sixteen. The following season, in 1980–81, Thomas and the Hoosiers once again won a conference title and won the 1981 NCAA tournament, Knight's second national title. In 1982–1983, with the strong play of Uwe Blab and All-Americans Ted Kitchel and Randy Wittman, the No. 1 ranked Hoosiers were favorites to win another national championship. However, with an injury to All-American Ted Kitchel mid-season, the Hoosiers' prospects were grim. Knight asked for fan support to rally around the team and, when the team ultimately won the Big Ten title, he ordered that a banner be hung for the team in Assembly Hall as a tribute to the fans, who he credited with inspiring the team to win its final three home games. Nevertheless, in the tournament Kitchel's absence was felt and the team lost to Kentucky in the 1983 Sweet Sixteen.

The 1985–86 Hoosiers were profiled in a best-selling book A Season on the Brink. To write it Knight granted author John Feinstein almost unprecedented access to the Indiana basketball program, as well as insights into Knight's private life. The following season, in 1986–87, the Hoosiers were led by All-American Steve Alford and captured a share of the Big Ten title. The team won Knight's third national championship (the school's fifth) against Syracuse in the 1987 NCAA tournament with a game-winning jump shot by Keith Smart with five seconds of play remaining in the championship game. In the 1988–1989 season the Hoosiers were led by All-American Jay Edwards and won a Big Ten championship.

1990s
From 1990–91 through 1992–93, the Hoosiers posted 87 victories, the most by any Big Ten team in a three-year span, breaking the mark of 86 set by Knight's Indiana teams of 1974–76. Teams from these three seasons spent all but two of the 53 poll weeks in the top 10, and 38 of them in the top 5. They captured two Big Ten crowns in 1990–91 and 1992–93, and during the 1991–92 season reached the Final Four. During the 1992–93 season, the 31–4 Hoosiers finished the season at the top of the AP Poll, but were defeated by Kansas in the Elite Eight. Teams from this era included Greg Graham, Pat Knight, All-Americans Damon Bailey and Alan Henderson Brian Evans, and National Player of the Year Calbert Cheaney.

Throughout the mid and late 1990s Knight continued to experience success with continual NCAA tournament appearances and a minimum of 19 wins each season. However, 1993 would be Knight's last conference championship and 1994 would be his last trip to the Sweet Sixteen.

Dismissal from Indiana

On March 14, 2000 (just before Indiana was to begin play in the NCAA tournament), the CNN Sports Illustrated network ran a piece on Robert Abbott's investigation of Knight in which former player Neil Reed claimed he had been choked by Knight during a practice in 1997. Knight denied the claims in the story. However, less than a month later, the network aired a tape of an Indiana practice from 1997 that appeared to show Knight placing his hand on the neck of Reed.

In response, Indiana University president Myles Brand announced that he had adopted a "zero tolerance" policy with regard to Knight's behavior. Later in the year, in September 2000, Indiana freshman Kent Harvey (not a basketball player) reportedly said, "Hey, Knight, what's up?" to Knight. According to Harvey, Knight then grabbed him by the arm and lectured him for not showing him respect, insisting that Harvey address him as either "Mr. Knight" or "Coach Knight" instead of simply "Knight." Brand stated that this incident was only one of numerous complaints that occurred after the zero-tolerance policy had been put into place. Brand asked Knight to resign on September 10, and when Knight refused, Brand relieved him of his coaching duties effective immediately. Knight's dismissal was met with outrage from students. That night, thousands of Indiana students marched from Indiana University's Assembly Hall to Brand's home, burning Brand in effigy.

Harvey was supported by some and vilified by many who claim he had intentionally set up Knight. Kent Harvey's stepfather, Mark Shaw, was a former Bloomington-area radio talk show host and Knight critic. On September 13, Knight said goodbye to a crowd of some 6,000 supporters in Dunn Meadow at Indiana University. He asked that they not hold a grudge against Harvey and that they continue to support the basketball team. Knight's firing made national headlines, including the cover of Sports Illustrated and around-the-clock coverage on ESPN.

In a March 2017 interview on The Dan Patrick Show, Knight stated that he had no interest in ever returning to Indiana. When host Dan Patrick commented that most of the administration that had fired Knight seventeen years earlier were no longer there, Knight said, "I hope they’re all dead."

Texas Tech

Following his dismissal from Indiana, Knight took a season off and was on the lookout for coaching vacancies. He accepted the head coaching position at Texas Tech, although his hiring was opposed by a faculty group that was led by Walter Schaller. When he was introduced at the press conference, Knight quipped, "This is without question the most comfortable red sweater I've had on in six years."

Knight quickly improved the program, which had not been to an NCAA tournament since 1996. He led the team to postseason appearances in each of his first four years at the school (three NCAA Championship tournaments and one NIT). After a rough 2006 season, the team improved in 2007, finishing 21–13 and again making it to the NCAA tournament, where it lost to Boston College in the first round. The best performance by the Red Raiders under Knight came in 2005 when they advanced as far as the Sweet Sixteen. In both 2006 and 2007 under Knight, Texas Tech defeated two Top 10-ranked teams in consecutive weeks. During Knight's first six years at Texas Tech, the Red Raiders won 126 games, an average of 21 wins per season.

Retirement
On February 4, 2008, Knight announced his retirement. His son Pat Knight, the head coach designate since 2005, was immediately named as his successor at Texas Tech. The younger Knight had said that after many years of coaching, his father was exhausted and ready to retire. Just after achieving his 900th win, Knight handed the job over to Pat in the mid-season in part to allow him to get acquainted with coaching the team earlier, instead of having him wait until October, the start of the next season. Knight continued to live in Lubbock after he retired.

International coaching
In 1979, Knight guided the United States Pan American team to a gold medal in Puerto Rico. In 1984 Knight led the U.S. national team to a gold medal in the Olympic Games as coach of the 1984 basketball team (coaches do not receive medals in the Olympics). Players on the team included Michael Jordan and Knight's Indiana player and protégé Steve Alford.

Life after coaching
In 2008, ESPN hired Knight as a studio analyst and occasional color commentator. In November 2012, he called an Indiana men's basketball game for the first time, something he had previously refused to do. Former Indiana men's basketball coach Tom Crean reached out to Knight in an attempt to get him to visit the school again. 
On April 2, 2015, ESPN announced that it would not renew its contract with Knight.

On February 27, 2019, Don Fischer, an IU radio announcer since 1974, said during an interview that Knight was in ill health. He continued by saying Knight's health “has declined” but did not offer any specifics.

On April 4, 2019, Knight made his first public appearance since Fischer made his comments. He appeared with longtime friend and journalist Bob Hammel and spoke about different aspects of his career. During the presentation, Knight seemed to struggle with his memory: he re-introduced his wife to the audience after doing so only 10 minutes earlier, he mistakenly said that former IU basketball player Landon Turner had died, and, after telling a story about Michael Jordan, he later told the same story, replacing Jordan with former IU basketball player Damon Bailey.

Knight and his wife resided in Lubbock, Texas even after his retirement. On July 10, 2019, the Indiana Daily Student, IU's campus newspaper, reported that Knight and his wife had purchased a home in Bloomington for $572,500, suggesting that Knight had decided to return to Bloomington to live.

On February 8, 2020, Knight was honored at an Indiana basketball game. It was the first Indiana game attended by Knight since his dismissal by the school 20 years prior.

Coaching philosophy
Knight was an innovator of the motion offense, which he perfected and popularized. The system emphasizes post players setting screens and perimeter players passing the ball until a teammate becomes open for an uncontested jump shot or lay-up. This required players to be unselfish, disciplined, and effective in setting and using screens to get open.

Knight's motion offense did not take shape until he began coaching at Indiana. Prior to that, at Army, he ran a "reverse action" that involved reversing the ball from one side of the floor to the other and screening along with it. According to Knight, it was a "West Coast offense" that Pete Newell used exclusively during his coaching career. After being exposed to the Princeton offense, Knight instilled more cutting with the offense he employed, which evolved into the motion offense that he ran for most of his career. Knight continued to develop the offense, instituting different cuts over the years and putting his players in different scenarios.

Knight was well known for the extreme preparation he put into each game and practice. He was often quoted as saying, "Most people have the will to win, few have the will to prepare to win." Often during practice, Knight would instruct his players to a certain spot on the floor and give them options of what to do based on how the defense might react. In contrast to set plays, Knight's offense was designed to react according to the defense.

The 3-point shot was adopted by the NCAA in 1986, which was midway through Knight's coaching career. Although he opposed the rule change throughout his life, it did complement his offense well by improving the spacing on the floor. He sardonically said at the time that he supported institution of the three point shot because if a team's offense was functioning efficiently enough to get a layup the team should be rewarded with three points for that basket. Knight's offense also emphasized a two-count. Players in the post are expected to try to post in the paint for two seconds and if they do not receive the ball they go set a screen. Players with the ball are expected to hold the ball for two seconds to see where they are going to take it. Screens are supposed to be held for two seconds, as well.

On defense Knight was known for emphasizing tenacious "man-to-man" defense where defenders contest every pass and every shot, and help teammates when needed. However, Knight has also incorporated a zone defense periodically after eschewing that defense for the first two decades of his coaching career.

Knight's coaching also included a firm emphasis on academics. All but four of his four-year players completed their degrees, which was a ratio of nearly 98 percent. Nearly 80 percent of his players graduated; this figure was much higher than the national average of 42 percent for Division 1 schools.

Legacy

Accomplishments
Knight's all time coaching record is 902–371. His 902 wins in NCAA Division I men's college basketball games is fourth all-time to Knight's former player Mike Krzyzewski, Syracuse head coach Jim Boeheim, and North Carolina head Coach Roy Williams. Knight achieved his 880th career win on January 1, 2007 and passed retired North Carolina coach Dean Smith for most career victories, a title he held until his win total was surpassed by Krzyzewski on November 15, 2011, by Jim Boeheim on December 30, 2012, and by Roy Williams on March 11, 2021. Knight is the youngest coach to reach 200 (age 35), 300 (age 40) and 400 (age 44) wins. He was also among the youngest to reach other milestones of 500 (age 48) and 600 (age 52) wins.

Texas Tech's participation in the 2007 NCAA tournament gave Knight more NCAA tournament appearances than any other coach. He is the only coach to win the NCAA, the NIT, an Olympic Gold medal, and a Pan American Games Gold medal. Knight is also one of only three people, along with Dean Smith and Joe B. Hall, who had both played on and coached an NCAA Tournament championship basketball team.

Recognition
Knight received a number of personal honors during and after his coaching career. He was named the National Coach of the Year four times (1975, 1976, 1987, 1989) and Big Ten Coach of the Year eight times (1973, 1975, 1976, 1980, 1981, 1989, 1992, 1993). In 1975 he was a unanimous selection as National Coach of the Year, an honor he was accorded again in 1976 by the Associated Press, United Press International, and Basketball Weekly. In 1987 he was the first person to be honored with the Naismith Coach of the Year Award. In 1989 he garnered National Coach of the Year honors by the AP, UPI, and the United States Basketball Writers Association. Knight was inducted into the Basketball Hall of Fame in 1991.

On November 17, 2006, Knight was recognized for his impact on college basketball as a member of the founding class of the National Collegiate Basketball Hall of Fame. The following year, he was the recipient of the Naismith Award for Men's Outstanding Contribution to Basketball. Knight was also inducted into the Army Sports Hall of Fame (Class of 2008) and the Indiana Hoosiers athletics Hall of Fame (Class of 2009). In August 2003, he was honored as the first inductee in The Vince Lombardi Titletown Legends.

Coaching tree
A number of Knight's assistant coaches, players, and managers have gone on to be coaches. Among them are Hall of Fame Duke coach Mike Krzyzewski, former UCLA coach Steve Alford, Murry Bartow, and former coach Dan Dakich,and NBA coaches Randy Wittman, Mike Woodson, Keith Smart, Isiah Thomas, former Evansville and current Eastern Illinois Coach Marty Simmons, former Saint Louis Coach Jim Crews, Lawrence Frank, and former Texas Tech and Ole Miss coach Chris Beard.

In the media

Books about Knight
In 1986, author John Feinstein published A Season on the Brink, which detailed the 1985–86 season of the Indiana Hoosiers. Granted almost unprecedented access to the Indiana basketball program, as well as insights into Knight's private life, the book quickly became a major best-seller and spawned a new genre, as a legion of imitators wrote works covering a single year of a sports franchise. In the book Feinstein depicts a coach who is quick with a violent temper, but also one who never cheats and strictly follows all of the NCAA's rules.

Two years later, author Joan Mellen penned the book Bob Knight: His Own Man, in part to rebut Feinstein's A Season on the Brink. Mellen deals with seemingly all the causes celebres in Knight's career and presents the view that he is more sinned against than sinning.

In 1990, Robert P. Sulek wrote Hoosier Honor: Bob Knight and Academic Success at Indiana University which discusses the academic side of the basketball program. The book details all of the players that have played for Knight and what degree they earned.

A number of close associates and friends of Knight have also written books about him. Former player and current Nevada Wolf Pack head basketball coach Steve Alford wrote Playing for Knight: My Six Seasons with Bobby Knight, published in 1990. Former player Kirk Haston wrote Days of Knight: How the General Changed My Life, published in 2016.

Knight's autobiography, written with longtime friend and sports journalist Bob Hammel, was titled Knight: My Story and published in 2003. Three years later Steve Delsohn and Mark Heisler wrote Bob Knight: An Unauthorized Biography.

In 2013, Knight and Bob Hammel published The Power of Negative Thinking: An Unconventional Approach to Achieving Positive Results. Knight discusses his approach to preparing for a game by anticipating all of the things that could go wrong and trying to prevent it or having a plan to deal with it. In the book Knight also shares one of his favorite sayings, "Victory favors the team making the fewest mistakes."

In 2017, sports reporter Terry Hutchens published Following the General: Why Three Coaches Have Been Unable to Return Indiana Basketball to Greatness which discussed Knight's coaching legacy with Indiana and how none of the coaches following him have been able to reach his level of success.

Film and television
Knight has appeared or been featured in numerous films and television productions. In 1994 a feature film titled Blue Chips featured a character named Pete Bell, a volatile but honest college basketball coach under pressure to win who decides to blatantly violate NCAA rules to field a competitive team after a sub-par season. It starred Nick Nolte as Bell and NBA star Shaquille O'Neal as Neon Bodeaux, a once-in-a-lifetime player that boosters woo to his school with gifts and other perks. The coach's temper and wardrobe were modeled after Knight's, though at no time had Knight been known to illegally recruit. Knight himself appears in the movie and coaches against Nolte in the film's climactic game.

ESPN's first feature-length film was A Season on the Brink, a 2002 TV adaptation from John Feinstein's book. In the movie Knight is played by Brian Dennehy. ESPN also featured Knight in a reality show titled Knight School, which followed a handful of Texas Tech students as they competed for the right to join the basketball team as a non-scholarship player.

Knight made a cameo appearance as himself in the 2003 film Anger Management. In 2008, Knight appeared in a commercial as part of Volkswagen's Das Auto series where Max, a 1964 black Beetle interviews famous people. When Knight talked about Volkswagen winning the best resale value award in 2008, Max replied, "At least one of us is winning a title this year." This prompted Knight to throw his chair off the stage and walk out saying, "I may not be retired."

Knight also made an appearance in a TV commercial for Guitar Hero: Metallica with fellow coaches Mike Krzyzewski, Rick Pitino, and Roy Williams, in a parody of Tom Cruise in Risky Business.

In 2009, Knight produced three instructional coaching DVD libraries—on motion offense, man-to-man defense, and instilling mental toughness—with Championship Productions.

Personal life and charitable donations

Knight married the former Nancy Falk on April 17, 1963. They had two sons, Tim and Pat, but the couple divorced in 1985. Pat Knight coached Texas Tech after his father's retirement before he moved to Lamar. In 1988, Knight married his second wife, Karen Vieth Edgar, a former Oklahoma high school basketball coach.

Knight has a high regard for education and has made generous donations to the schools he has been a part of, particularly libraries. At Indiana University Knight endowed two chairs, one in history and one in law. He also raised nearly $5 million for the Indiana University library system by championing a library fund to support the library's activities. The fund was ultimately named in his honor.

When Knight came to Texas Tech in 2001, he gave $10,000 to the library, the first gift to the Coach Knight Library Fund which has now collected over $300,000. On November 29, 2007, the Texas Tech library honored this with A Legacy of Giving: The Bob Knight Exhibit.

Knight supported Donald Trump's 2016 presidential campaign, and later made an appearance at his rally in Indianapolis for the 2018 midterms. At the rally, Knight called Trump "a great defender of the United States of America".

Criticism and controversy

1970s
It was reported years after the incident that Knight choked and punched IU's longtime sports information director, Kit Klingelhoffer, in the 1970s, over a news release that upset the coach.
 On December 7, 1974, Indiana and Kentucky met in the regular season in Bloomington with a 98–74 Indiana win. Near the end of the game, Knight went to the Kentucky bench where the official was standing to complain about a call. Before he left, Knight hit Kentucky coach Joe B. Hall in the back of the head. Kentucky's assistant coach Lynn Nance, a former FBI agent who was about 6 feet 5 inches, had to be restrained by Hall from hitting Knight. Hall later said, "It publicly humiliated me." Knight said the slap to the head was something he has done, "affectionately" to his own players for years. "But maybe someone would not like that," he said. "If Joe didn't like it, I offer an apology. I don't apologize for the intent." ... "Hall and I have been friends for a long time," Knight said. "If he wants to dissolve the friendship, that's up to him." Knight blamed the furor on Hall, stating, "If it was meant to be malicious, I'd have blasted the fucker into the seats."
 During the 1979 Pan American Games in San Juan, Puerto Rico, Knight was accused of assaulting a police officer while coaching the US Basketball team before a practice session. He was later convicted in absentia to a six-month jail sentence, but extradition efforts by the Puerto Rican government were not successful.
 1960 Olympic gold medalist Douglas Blubaugh was head wrestling coach at IU from 1973 to 1984. Early in his tenure while he jogged in the practice facility during basketball practice, Knight yelled at him to leave, using more than one expletive. Blubaugh pinned Knight to a wall, and told him never to repeat his performance. He never did.

1980s
 In a game at Bloomington on January 31, 1981 between Indiana and Purdue, Hoosier star Isiah Thomas allegedly hit Purdue guard Roosevelt Barnes in what some critics described as a "sucker punch". Video replay shown by Knight later showed Barnes had mistakenly thrown the first punch, and that Thomas was merely reacting to this. When the two schools played their second game of the season at Purdue on February 7, 1981, Knight claimed a number of derisive chants were directed at him, his wife, and Indiana University. In response, Knight invited Purdue athletic director George King on his weekly television show to discuss the matter, but King declined. Therefore, in place of King, Knight brought onto the show a "jackass" (male donkey) wearing a Purdue hat as a representative of Purdue. The 1980–81 Hoosiers would go on to win the 1981 NCAA National Championship, the school's fourth national title.
 On Saturday, February 23, 1985 during a game at Bloomington between Purdue and Indiana, just five minutes into the game, a scramble for a loose ball resulted in a foul call on Indiana's Marty Simmons. Immediately after the resumption of play, a foul was called on Indiana's Daryl Thomas. Knight, irate, insisted the first of the two calls should have been for a jump ball and ultimately received a technical foul. Purdue's Steve Reid stepped to the free throw line to shoot the resulting free throws, but before he could, Knight grabbed a red plastic chair from Indiana's bench and threw it across the floor toward the basket in front of Reid. Knight was charged with second and third technical fouls and was ejected from the game. He apologized for his actions the next day and was given a one-game suspension and two years' probation from the Big Ten. Since the incident, Knight has occasionally joked about throwing the chair by saying that he saw an old lady standing on the opposite sideline and threw her the chair so she could sit down.
 Women's groups nationwide were outraged by Knight's comments during an April 1988 interview with Connie Chung in which he said, "I think that if rape is inevitable, relax and enjoy it." Knight's comment was in reference to an Indiana basketball game in which he felt the referees were making poor calls against the Hoosiers. The same comment had already gotten weatherman Tex Antoine fired from WABC-TV in New York twelve years earlier and would ultimately derail the Texas gubernatorial bid of Clayton Williams two years later.

1990s
 At a practice leading up to an Indiana–Purdue game in West Lafayette in 1991, Knight unleashed a torrent of expletives and threats designed to motivate his Indiana team. In one portion he exclaimed he was "fucking tired of losing to Purdue." Unknown to most, someone was secretly taping the speech. The speech has since gone viral and has over 1.84 million views on YouTube alone. Although it is still not known who taped the speech, many former players suspect it was team manager Lawrence Frank. Players who were present were unable to remember the specific speech because such expletive-filled outbursts by Knight were so frequent.
 In March 1992 prior to the NCAA regional finals, controversy erupted after Knight playfully mock whipped Indiana players Calbert Cheaney and Pat Graham during practice. The bullwhip had been given to Knight as a gift from his team. Several black leaders complained at the racial connotations of the act, given that Cheaney was a black student.
 In January 1993, Knight mentioned the recruiting of Ivan Renko, a fictitious Yugoslavian player he had created. Knight created Renko in an attempt to expose disreputable basketball recruiting experts. Even though Renko was completely fictitious, several recruiting services started listing him as a prospect with in-depth descriptions of his potential and game style. Some of the more reputable recruiting gurus claimed to have never heard of Renko, whereas some other "experts" even claimed to possess or to see film of him actually playing basketball.
 Knight was recorded berating an NCAA volunteer at a March 1995 post-game press conference following a 65–60 loss to Missouri in the first round of the NCAA tournament held in Boise, Idaho. The volunteer, Rance Pugmire, informed the press that Knight would not be attending the press conference, when in reality, Knight was running a few minutes late and had planned on attending per NCAA rules. Knight was shown saying: "You've only got two people that are going to tell you I'm not going to be here. One is our SID, and the other is me. Who the hell told you I wasn't going to be here? I'd like to know. Do you have any idea who it was? ... Who? ... They were from Indiana, right? ... No, they weren't from Indiana, and you didn't get it from anybody from Indiana, did you?...No, I—I'll handle this the way I want to handle it now that I'm here. You (EXPLETIVE) it up to begin with. Now just sit there or leave. I don't give (EXPLETIVE) what you do. Now back to the game."
 Former Indiana player Neil Reed alleged that Knight had grabbed him by the neck in a choking manner during a 1997 practice. A videotape of the incident was shown on CNN.
 Neil Reed and former Indiana player Richard Mandeville alleged in a CNN interview that Knight once showed players his own feces. According to Mandeville, Knight said, "'This is how you guys are playing.'"

2000s
 On February 19, 2000, Clarence Doninger, Knight's boss, alleged to have been physically threatened by Knight during a confrontation after a game.
 An Indiana investigation inquired about an allegation in which Knight berated and physically intimidated a university secretary, once throwing a potted plant in anger, showering her with glass and debris. The university later asked Knight to issue an apology to the secretary.
 It was alleged that Knight attacked assistant coach Ron Felling, throwing him out of a chair after overhearing him criticizing the basketball program in a phone conversation.
 On September 8, 2000, Indiana freshman Kent Harvey, who’s step-father was once a local radio host and also a fierce critic of Knight, told campus police Knight grabbed him roughly by the arm and berated him for speaking to Knight disrespectfully. Knight admitted putting his hand on the student's arm and lecturing him on civility, but denied that he was rough or raised his voice. Knight was fired from the university two days later.
 Two days after Knight was fired from Indiana University, Jeremy Schaap of ESPN interviewed him and discussed his time at Indiana. Towards the end of the interview, Knight talked about his son, Pat, who had also been dismissed by the university, wanting an opportunity to be a head coach. Schaap, thinking that Knight was finished, attempted to move on to another subject, but Knight insisted on continuing about his son. Schaap repeatedly tried to ask another question when Knight shifted the conversation to Schaap's style of interviewing, notably chastising him about interruptions. Knight then commented (referring to Schaap's father, Dick Schaap), "You've got a long way to go to be as good as your dad."
 In March 2006, a student's heckling at Baylor University resulted in Knight having to be restrained by a police officer. The incident was not severe enough to warrant any action from the Big 12 Conference.
 On November 13, 2006, Knight was shown allegedly hitting player Michael Prince under the chin to get him to make eye contact. Although Knight did not comment on the incident afterwards, Prince, his parents, and Texas Tech Athletic Director Gerald Myers insisted that Knight did nothing wrong and that he merely lifted Prince's chin and told him, "Hold your head up and don't worry about mistakes. Just play the game." Prince commented, "He was trying to teach me and I had my head down so he raised my chin up. He was telling me to go out there and don't be afraid to make mistakes. He said I was being too hard on myself." ESPN analyst Fran Fraschilla defended Knight by saying "That's coaching!"
 On October 21, 2007, James Simpson of Lubbock, Texas, accused Knight of firing a shotgun in his direction after he yelled at Knight and another man for hunting too close to his home. Knight denied the allegations. An argument between the two men was recorded via camera phone and aired later on television.

2010s
 On April 18, 2011, video surfaced showing Knight responding to a question concerning John Calipari and Kentucky's men's basketball team by stating that in the previous season, Kentucky made an Elite Eight appearance with "five players who had not attended a single class that semester." These claims were later disproven by the University and the players in question, including Patrick Patterson, who graduated in three years, and John Wall, who finished the semester in question with a 3.5 GPA. Knight later apologized for his comments stating, "My overall point is that 'one-and-dones' are not healthy for college basketball. I should not have made it personal to Kentucky and its players and I apologize."
 Former Indiana basketball player Todd Jadlow has written a book alleging that from 1985 to 1989, Knight punched him in the face, broke a clipboard over the top of his head, and squeezed his testicles and the testicles of other Hoosiers, among other abuses.
 In 2016, Knight was investigated by the FBI for inappropriate behavior exhibited while speaking on July 10, 2015 at an event sponsored by the National Geospatial-Intelligence Agency.

Head coaching record

(*) Indicates record/standing at timeof resignation from Texas Tech

See also
 List of college men's basketball coaches with 600 wins
 List of NCAA Division I Men's Final Four appearances by coach

References

www.bobknight.com - Knight Legacy, LCC was formed to honor, promote, and preserve the Coach Knight Legacy. The exclusive company to use the name, image, and likeness of Coach Knight.

External links

 Texas Tech profile
Indiana profile
 

 BobKnight.com

1940 births
Living people
American men's basketball players
American Olympic coaches
Army Black Knights men's basketball coaches
Basketball coaches from Ohio
Basketball players from Ohio
College basketball announcers in the United States
College basketball controversies in the United States
College men's basketball head coaches in the United States
Forwards (basketball)
High school basketball coaches in Ohio
Indiana Hoosiers men's basketball coaches
Indiana Republicans
Naismith Memorial Basketball Hall of Fame inductees
Ohio State Buckeyes men's basketball players
People from Cuyahoga Falls, Ohio
People from Orrville, Ohio
Sportspeople from Massillon, Ohio
Texas Tech Red Raiders basketball coaches
United States Army soldiers
United States men's national basketball team coaches